Sheykh Musa may refer to:
 Sheykh Musa, Mazandaran
 Sheykh Musa, Zanjan
 Sheykh Musa Rural District, in Golestan Province